Bisuyu is one of 54 parishes in Cangas del Narcea, a municipality within the province and autonomous community of Asturias, in northern Spain. 

Villages
 Bisuyu
 Cupuertu
 Eirrondu de Bisuyu
 Feidiel
 L'Outrieḷḷu
 Pousada de Bisuyu
 San Romanu de Bisuyu
 Sanabuega
 Zreicéu

External links
 Official website 

Parishes in Cangas del Narcea